Hilda Chedomille Madsen (December 13, 1910 – May 1, 1981) was a British-American artist and dog breeder.

Early life
Born Hilda Chedomille Narracott in Belgium, to an English father (who died in World War I) and American mother (the Fay family of Bennington, Vermont).  Her mother was an artist, and Hilda also studied art, graduating from the Sorbonne Art School in Paris.

Her mother remarried an Italian, and Hilda moved to Italy, where she became fluent in Italian (as well as French and English). She met her future husband, Viggo, a Danish ship communications officer, while both were touring the Vatican.

They married and moved to the United States in 1935, living in New York, Pennsylvania and New Jersey, where they raised their three sons.

Dog breeding career
In 1960, Madsen got her first Newfoundland (dog), and over time became a leading breeder, founding Hilvig Kennels. In 1977, Time magazine  described her as “the grand dame of Newfoundland dog breeders”, and a “revolutionary” in seeking to resolve the conflicting goals of the physical requirements of the show ring and the traditional attributes of a good working dog.

In 1968, she won a rare triple award at the US's most prestigious show, the Westminster Kennel Club show in New York.

Art career
Madsen had several one-woman shows, and was best known for portraits and animal studies.

Personal life
She married Viggo Madsen (born June 9, 1904), a Danish ship communications officer.  They had three sons:
Eric Viggo Madsen (born October 12, 1936; died January 26, 1973)
Keith Madsen
Alan Madsen

Among Hilda Madsen's great-grandchildren are:
Kip Johnson, a musician studying at UNC in Chapel Hill, North Carolina, and 
Lane Johnson, a musician at Eastern Guilford High School in North Carolina

References
NCA obituary
Time magazine article

External links
Hilda Madsen's 1934 British passport at PassportLand.com

1910 births
1981 deaths
Dog breeders
Dog trainers
American artists
Belgian expatriates in Italy
Belgian emigrants to the United States
20th-century American zoologists